The Love Malaysia Party is a Malaysian political party formed in August 6, 2009. Its members include former Gerakan vice-president and Member of Parliament Huan Cheng Guan, and former Sarawak State Assembly independent member for Ngemah seat; Gabriel Adit Demong. For the first time ever, the party contested the Sarawak state election, 2011 using its own logo after approval was given by the Election Commission. However, party lost its only seat, Ngemah, by 995 votes to Barisan Nasional, and their candidates were defeated in other seats such as Simunjan, Balai Ringin, Machan and Bekenu. Despite the defeat, PCM had contested in various seats in Penang and other states in Malaysia as well in the 13th General Elections.

During the 13th Malaysian general election, 2013, PCM failed to win any of the seats its candidates contested, with most candidates further losing their deposits. As a result, the party closed all its service centres in the state of Penang.

In the 14th Malaysian general election, 2018, PCM become Gagasan Sejahtera's strategic partner, and again lost in all the seats it had contested, with their candidates losing their deposits. As a result, the party is unrepresented in the Dewan Rakyat and state legislative assemblies of Malaysia.  Huan Cheng Guan also resigned from PCM Deputy President and quit active politics on 14 May 2018 in keeping his promise as Lim Guan Eng is out of Penang.

Leadership structure 

 President:
 Huan Cheng Guan
 Deputy Presidents:
 Datuk Ali anak Biju
 Johnical Rayong Ngipa
 Julius Enchana
 Andrew Bugie Ipang
 Vice-Presidents:
 Dato' Sri Mustapa Mohamed
 
 
 

 Secretary-General:
 Prabakaran A/L Krishnan
 Treasurer:
 
 Information Chief:
 
 Organising Secretary:
  
 Director of Communications:
 
 Director of Electoral Strategies:
 
 Central Committee Members:

General election results

See also 
 List of political parties in Malaysia

References

External links 
 Official Facebook
 Singapore Elections

Political parties in Malaysia
Conservative parties in Malaysia
Political parties established in 2009
2009 establishments in Malaysia